Disabled skiing was a demonstration event at the Winter Olympic Games on two occasions, in 1984 and 1988. Afterwards, the Paralympic Games were held in the same location as the Olympics and it was judged that as a demonstration event it was redundant.
At the 1984 and 1988 Games, medals were awarded to the top three positions, but these medals were smaller in size and did not contribute to the overall medal count.

1984 Winter Olympics

At the 1984 Games in Sarajevo, four events in paralympic alpine skiing were contested, all for men only.  Giant slalom races were held for four different standing disability classes.

1988 Winter Olympics

At the 1988 Games in Calgary, events were held in paralympic alpine skiing for both men and women (giant slalom for a single standing disability class), and in paralympic cross-country skiing for both men and women (5 km for the visually impaired).

References
 
 

Discontinued sports at the Winter Olympics
Skiing at the Winter Olympics
Olympic demonstration sports